Flavius L. Brooke (October 1, 1858 – January 21, 1921) was a member of the Michigan Supreme Court from 1908 to 1921.

Brooke was born in Ontario. He immigrated to Michigan in 1885 and then practiced law, in Detroit, Michigan. In 1901, he became a judge of the Wayne County, Michigan Circuit Court. Brooke served on the Michigan Supreme Court from 1915 until his death in 1921. He was the chief justice.

On his death, Howard Wiest was appointed by Governor Alex Groesbeck to fill the seat.

Notes

1858 births
1921 deaths
Canadian emigrants to the United States
Lawyers from Detroit
People from Ontario
Michigan state court judges
Chief Justices of the Michigan Supreme Court
19th-century American judges
20th-century American lawyers
19th-century American lawyers
Justices of the Michigan Supreme Court